The Women's 200 metre breaststroke competition of the 2021 FINA World Swimming Championships (25 m) was held on 21 December 2021.

Records
Prior to the competition, the existing world and championship records were as follows.

Results

Heats
The heats were started at 09:52.

Final
The final was held at 18:41.

References

Women's 200 metre breaststroke
2021 in women's swimming